Joseph Théophile Louis Marie Madec (March 15, 1923 – February 6, 2013) was a  French Prelate of the Roman Catholic Church.  

Joseph Théophile Louis Marie Madec was born in Ploërmel, France, and ordained a priest on April 5, 1947. Madec was appointed bishop of the Diocese of Fréjus-Toulon on February 8, 1983, and consecrated on April 10, 1983. Madec was the bishop of Diocese of Fréjus-Toulon until his retirement on May 16, 2000.

See also
Diocese of Fréjus-Toulon

External links
Catholic-Hierarchy
Diocese of Fréjus-Toulon (French)

1923 births
2013 deaths
People from Ploërmel
20th-century Roman Catholic bishops in France